The 1923 Quantico Marines Devil Dogs football team represented the Quantico Marine Base in the 1923 college football season. The team was led by third-year head coach John Beckett. In a 10-game schedule, the team went 7–2–1, with losses to VMI and Michigan. Between those two losses, the team had a six-game winning streak where they outscored opponents by an aggregate of 248–3. The season ended with a tie against Haskell and a 7–0 win over military rival Third Army Corps.

Schedule

Game summaries

at Michigan

On November 10, 1923, the Quantico Marines faced the 1923 Michigan Wolverines football team at Ferry Field in Ann Arbor, Michigan. The game was attended by 2,000 Marines and by several dignitaries, including Secretary of the Navy Edwin Denby, who had played football at Michigan in the 1890s, and Marine Corps Commandant John A. Lejeune. The Wolverines, who went on to an undefeated season and a national championship, defeated the Marines, 26–6.  The Marines took the opening kickoff and drove 89 yards for a touchdown, using "a bewildering aerial and line attack."  The Marines' touchdown was the only one scored on Michigan during the entire 1923 season.  The Marines led 6–0 at the end of the first quarter, but Michigan then scored 26 unanswered points.  Quarterback Irwin Uteritz led Michigan's comeback, scoring a touchdown in the second quarter on a dive between center Jack Blott's legs.  Uteritz later left the game with a broken leg and was replaced by Tod Rockwell at quarterback.  When Rockwell came into the game, Michigan lined up for a field goal with Rockwell holding the ball.  As the Marines came through to block the kick, Rockwell jumped to his feet and ran the ball 26 yards for a touchdown.

Notes

References

External links
 Video of 1923 Michigan game

Quantico
Quantico Marines Devil Dogs football seasons
Quantico Marines Devil Dogs football